Steve Savard is an American sports anchor and the former "Voice of the St. Louis Rams", serving in that role from 1999 to 2015.  He was the lead news anchor and former sportscaster at KMOV in St. Louis, Missouri.  Savard, a St. Louis native, attended Parkway North High School and Northwest Missouri State University where he graduated in 1986 with degrees in English and journalism.  Steve has won six Emmy Awards, including best sportscaster.  In February 2013, he made the switch from sports to become a  news anchor in which he co-anchors the 10:00 p.m. edition of News 4. In May 2013, he added the 6:00 p.m. newscast to his duties at KMOV.

Savard succeeded Gary Bender as the "Voice of the Rams" in 1999 (the season in which they won Super Bowl XXXIV), and was succeeded upon the Rams' move back to Los Angeles after 2015 by J. B. Long.

Savard was among 16 people laid off from KMOV on September 17, 2020; the station cited that the cuts were due to the COVID-19 pandemic. Savard was named Lead Anchor of KOLR10 news in Springfield, Missouri on May 14, 2021.

References

External links
Biography at KMOV
Steve Savard's blog "Field Notes"

Living people
American radio sports announcers
St. Louis Rams announcers
People from St. Louis
National Football League announcers
Northwest Missouri State University alumni
Year of birth missing (living people)